Maxine Stuart (June 28, 1918 – June 6, 2013) was an American actress.

Biography
Stuart was born in Deal, New Jersey as Maxine Shlivek, and raised in Manhattan and Lawrence, Nassau County, New York.

Stuart was a life member of The Actors Studio. Her Broadway credits include At War With the Army (1949), A Goose for the Gander (1945), Nine Girls (1943), Ring Two (1939), Sunup to Sundown (1938), and Western Waters (1937).

On television, she portrayed B.J. Clawson in Slattery's People, Amanda Earp in The Rousters, Ruth Burton in Room for One More, Steve's grandmother in The Pursuit of Happiness, Maureen in Norby, Mrs. Jackson in Margie, and Lenore in Hail to the Chief.

She also appeared in numerous other television series, including: Perry Mason Season4/Episode12 "The Case of the  Resolute Reformer" as Grace Witt; The Donna Reed Show, The Asphalt Jungle, Stoney Burke, The Outer Limits, Mr. Novak, The Wonder Years, Chicago Hope, Judging Amy NYPD Blue, The Twilight Zone, and Trapper John, MD, as well as the daytime dramas The Edge of Night, and The Young and the Restless.

She appeared in TV movies such as Goodbye, Raggedy Ann (1971) and The Suicide Club (1974). She appeared in feature films such as The Prisoner of Second Avenue (1975), Private Benjamin (1980), Coast to Coast (1980), and Time Share (2000).

Personal life
Stuart was married to actors Frank Maxwell and later, David Shaw. She was a friend of writer Helene Hanff and is mentioned in Hanff's book 84, Charing Cross Road and is portrayed by Jean De Baer in the 1987 film of the same name.

Death
Maxine Stuart died June 6, 2013, at her Beverly Hills, California home of natural causes at the age of 94.

Recognition
For her role in The Wonder Years in 1989, Stuart was nominated for the Primetime Emmy Award for Outstanding Guest Actress in a Comedy Series.

References

External links
 
 
 
 2004 Stuart's video interview with Archive of American Television
 

1918 births
2013 deaths
American film actresses
American television actresses
Actresses from New Jersey
People from Deal, New Jersey
People from Lawrence, Nassau County, New York
21st-century American women